Eurois nigra, the great black dart moth, is a species of cutworm or dart moth in the family Noctuidae. It was first described by Smith in 1927 and it is found in North America.

The MONA or Hodges number for Eurois nigra is 10931.

Subspecies
Two subspecies belong to Eurois nigra:
 Eurois nigra argni Barnes & Benjamin, 1927 c g
 Eurois nigra nigra g
Data sources: i = ITIS, c = Catalogue of Life, g = GBIF, b = Bugguide.net

References

Further reading

 
 
 

Noctuinae
Articles created by Qbugbot
Moths described in 1892